In mathematics, especially in the field of group theory, a pronormal subgroup is a subgroup that is embedded in a nice way.  Pronormality is a simultaneous generalization of both normal subgroups and abnormal subgroups such as Sylow subgroups, .

A subgroup is pronormal if each of its conjugates is conjugate to it already in the subgroup generated by it and its conjugate. That is, H is pronormal in G if for every g in G, there is some k in the subgroup generated by H and Hg such that Hk = Hg. (Here Hg denotes the conjugate subgroup gHg-1.)

Here are some relations with other subgroup properties:

Every normal subgroup is pronormal.
Every Sylow subgroup is pronormal.
Every pronormal subnormal subgroup is normal.
Every abnormal subgroup is pronormal.

Every pronormal subgroup is weakly pronormal, that is, it has the Frattini property.
Every pronormal subgroup is paranormal, and hence polynormal.

References

Subgroup properties